Bollée may refer to:

 Éolienne Bollée, an unusual wind turbine 
 Amédée Bollée (1844–1917), a French bellfounder and automobile pioneer
 Annegret Bollée (born 1937), German linguist and academic
 Léon Bollée (1870–1913), a French automobile manufacturer and inventor
 Léon Bollée Automobiles
 Stade Léon-Bollée, a multi-purpose stadium in Le Mans, France

See also
 Bollé (disambiguation)
 Bollea (disambiguation)